Ludovic-Henri-Marie-Ixile Julien-Laferrière (born 7 Sep 1838 in Paris – 12 August 1896) was a French clergyman and bishop for the Roman Catholic Diocese of Constantine. He became ordained in 1868. He was appointed bishop in 1894. He died on 12 August 1896, at the age of 58.

References

19th-century French Roman Catholic bishops
1838 births
1896 deaths
Clergy from Paris
19th-century Roman Catholic bishops in Africa
French Roman Catholic bishops in Africa
Roman Catholic bishops of Constantine